is a former Japanese football player.

Club statistics

References

External links

1983 births
Living people
Komazawa University alumni
Association football people from Kumamoto Prefecture
Japanese footballers
J2 League players
Japan Football League players
Roasso Kumamoto players
Association football midfielders